Dmytro Kopytov (born 29 May 1998) is a professional Ukrainian football midfielder, who plays for SC Poltava in the Ukrainian Second League.

Career
Kopytov is a product of the Horpynko Sportive School Poltava and Metalurh Donetsk youth team systems.

After dissolution of Metalurh Donetsk in 2015, he was signed by FC Stal Kamianske and made his debut for main-squad FC Stal as a substituted player in the game against FC Shakhtar Donetsk on 29 July 2017 in the Ukrainian Premier League.

References

External links
Profile at FFU Official Site (Ukr)

1998 births
Living people
Ukrainian footballers
Ukrainian expatriate footballers
Ukrainian Premier League players
FC Stal Kamianske players
FC Dynamo Kyiv players
FC Kramatorsk players
FC Bukovyna Chernivtsi players
FC Rubikon Kyiv players
SC Poltava players
Association football midfielders
Expatriate footballers in Armenia
Ukrainian expatriate sportspeople in Armenia
Sportspeople from Poltava Oblast
21st-century Ukrainian people